Ernest Joseph Mason (1870–1904) was a professional baseball player who played pitcher in the Major Leagues for the St. Louis Browns in 1894.

External links

1870 births
1904 deaths
Major League Baseball pitchers
Baseball players from Louisiana
19th-century baseball players
St. Louis Browns (NL) players
Memphis Fever Germs players
Memphis Giants players
Evansville Black Birds players
Lynchburg Hill Climbers players
Syracuse Stars (minor league baseball) players
Batavia Giants players
Geneva Alhambras players